Abbe Joanna May (born 19 July 1983) is an Australian singer-songwriter, musician and human rights campaigner. From 2002 she pursued her music career in Perth-based groups, The Fuzz, Abbe May and the Rockin' Pneumonia, and The Devil & Abbe May. In 2010 she began to perform as Abbe May and released her solo album, Design Desire, in July 2011. She followed with Kiss My Apocalypse in May 2013. At the ARIA Music Awards of 2013, May was nominated for Best Female Artist for her album. May has been nominated for a total 27 (winning 21) West Australian Music Industry awards since 2008.

Life and career
Abbe Joanna May was born on 19 July 1983 in Subiaco, a Perth suburb. Her mother taught English literature. May has an older brother, Douglas May (born ca. 1980). She attended a local Catholic school. Abbe spent her late teens and early twenties performing in rock venues and studios across Australia, touring around the country in various solo and band incarnations. Throughout her career, Abbe has been an ARIA, WAM, AIR, AMP winning and nominated artist and a dedicated member of the LGBTIQA+ community.

By 2002 she had moved back to Perth to further her career in music and performed lead vocals in a music group, The Fuzz, alongside her brother, KT Rumble (aka Douglas May), on lead guitar. The Fuzz had been formed by Douglas with Jiah Fishenden on guitar, Shayne Macri on bass guitar and Ben Mountford on drums. One of their early tracks, "The Bomb", which was co-written by May with her bandmates, won the Western Australian final of national radio station, Triple J's Unearthed competition in October 2002.

The Fuzz issued two extended plays, Dead on the Road (2004) and Take the Money (November 2004), and a studio album, 100 Demons (8 August 2005). In October 2005 Dylan McCardle reviewed their CD launch of the latter for PerthSounds.com, which was "a return to simple but powerful formula that is rock 'n' roll ... a night where female vocalists came to the fore, and Abbe May is certainly amongst the cream of the crop. She gave 110% percent with her vocals, she jumped up and down the stage like a woman possessed".

By 2006 May (on lead vocals and guitar) had formed an "electric blues" group, Abbe May and the Rockin' Pneumonia, with Douglas, joined by Alex Archer on violin; Todd Pickett on percussion and vocals; Alien Smith; and Pete Stone on bass guitar. They issued a self-titled EP in that year and followed with an album, Howl & Moan in April 2008.

Abbe May and the Rockin' Pneumonia released a second EP, Hawaiian Disease, in June 2009. For that disc May supplied lead vocals; wah, delay and slide guitars; and a 70's drum machine. The Sydney Morning Heralds reviewer, Bernard Zuel, found the EP was another "hugely impressive release" from "Perth's blues-rock guitarist/tear-down-the-walls singer"; he cited her description of the title track, "Every line is a euphemism for oral sex. I've been collecting sex slang over the years and I've got this great dictionary of sex slang, too, as well as having a general interest in all things sleazy".

In 2008 she formed a side project, The Devil & Abbe May, which was a "more country blues outfit", with Douglas, Archer, Pickett and Stone, joined by David Craft on vocals and harmonica; and Jesse Woodward on banjo and bass guitar. This group issued an album, Hoodoo You Do in that year. Amazon.com's editorial review declares "[it] is a shambolic voodoo blues album that is both hauntingly beautiful and disarmingly humorous. A five star album from a five star eccentric".

From 2010 Abbe May performed under her own name and released her debut solo album, Design Desire, in July 2011. Zuel noted that May is "drawing from urban and country blues rather than pub rock boogie, riding on swing rather than just thrust, wearing its open sexiness lightly and its wicked humour comfortably" and she had delivered "a rock album smarter and tougher than the rest". According to May it is "about love and lust and the mysteries and miseries that accompany those things. I didn't consciously sit down and decide to write about these themes but I guess they were playing on my mind at the time of writing these songs".

May released another album, Kiss My Apocalypse, in May 2013. Cate Summers at theMusic.com.au felt May had "made a swift U-turn on her previously guitar-heavy style, and this new album highlights her subsequent transition towards what she’s labeled 'doom pop'". Mess+Noise's Kate Hennessey noted that May is "strong, talented, irreverent and sexual; aspects of being a woman that are so rarely role-modeled in a holistic way – or in a way that talks to me – that I want to defend her against comments that seem irritatingly reductive" and despite some fans' fears that "ditching the blues muse and aspiring to a mainstream pop aesthetic would leach her authenticity. The opposite occurs ... By snipping ties to the blues' ground-bound earthiness, May’s self-expression can – and has – soared, and she's transmitting more personally than ever". At the ARIA Music Awards of 2013 May was nominated for Best Female Artist for Kiss My Apocalypse.

On 2 February 2018 Abbe released her fifth studio album, Fruit. Music critic Bernard Zuel said that the album is, "one of the important albums of 2018." Spending four years on its creation, Fruit boasts a melodic, upbeat and soulful collection of songs. Caitlin Welsh from The Australian states that, "Fruit settles comfortably into its themes… the thrill of being direct about what you want and who you are." It is her most succinct and powerful declaration of identity yet. Australian digital radio station site Double J said, "Abbe May has been open about this record being her first after coming out, and these short, oblique moments add plenty to that narrative. She speaks of 'private shame' she felt through her life, presumably about her sexuality, before 'Seventeen' reveals intimate details of her life in love."  Giving the album four stars, The Newcastle Herald stated that it "is the Perth singer - songwriter's most accomplished piece of art." Fruit also received a four - star rating from The Music stating that Fruit, "boasts the kind of sophisticated songwriting an artist like Prince might once have been responsible for." "Seventeen" is the latest single from Fruit which debut at #1 on the Australian Independent Record Labels Association's 100% Independent Album Chart.

Discography

Studio albums

Extended plays

Singles

Advertisements

Music from Abbe May's "Design Desire" single was used in a Jägermeister television commercial in 2012.

Television

Music from Abbe May's "Mammalian Locomotion" single was used in the U.S. television series Entourage ending credits - Season 8 Episode 6, air date 28 August 2011. Music from Abbe May's "Cast That Devil Out" single was used in the Australian television series Packed to the Rafters - Season 5 Episode 9, air date 12 June 2012.

Awards and nominations

AIR Awards
The Australian Independent Record Awards (commonly known informally as AIR Awards) is an annual awards night to recognise, promote and celebrate the success of Australia's Independent Music sector.

|-
| 2008
| Abbe May
| Best New Independent Artist
| 
|-
| rowspan="2" | 2011
| Abbe May
| Best Independent Artist
| 
|-
| Design Desire
| Best Independent Album
| 
|-

APRA Awards
The APRA Awards are presented annually from 1982 by the Australasian Performing Right Association (APRA), "honouring composers and songwriters". They commenced in 1982.

! 
|-
| 2012 
| "Design Desire"
| Song of the Year
| 
| 
|-

ARIA Music Awards

|-
| 2013 || Kiss My Apocalypse || Best Female Artist ||

Australian Music Prize

|-
| 2011 || Abbe May - "Design Desire" || Australian Music Prize || 
|-
| 2018 || Abbe May - "Fruit" || Australian Music Prize ||

J Awards
The J Awards are an annual series of Australian music awards that were established by the Australian Broadcasting Corporation's youth-focused radio station Triple J. They commenced in 2005.

|-
| J Awards of 2013
|Kiss My Apocalypse
| Australian Album of the Year
|

National Live Music Awards
The National Live Music Awards (NLMAs) are a broad recognition of Australia's diverse live industry, celebrating the success of the Australian live scene. The awards commenced in 2016.

|-
| 2016 || Abbe May|| Live Voice of the Year ||

WAM Song of the Year
The WAM Song of the Year was formed by the  Western Australian Rock Music Industry Association Inc. (WARMIA) in 1985, with its main aim to develop and run annual awards recognising achievements within the music industry in Western Australia.

 (wins only)
|-
| 2006
| "Sidewindin'"
| Blues/Roots Song of the Year
| 
|-
| rowspan=2| 2008
| rowspan=2| "Howl and Moan"
| Blues/Roots Song of the Year
| 
|-
| Rock Song of the Year
| 
|-
| rowspan=3| 2013
| rowspan=3| "Nourishment" by Mathas (featuring Abbe May)
| Electronic/Dance Song of the Year
| 
|-
| Urban / Hip Hop of the Year
| 
|-
| Grand Prize
| 
|-

West Australian Music Awards
The West Australian Music Industry Awards (WAMIs) are annual awards presented to the local contemporary music industry, put on annually by the Western Australian Music Industry Association Inc (WAM).

|-
| rowspan=4|2008 || rowspan=3 | Abbe May and The Rockin’ Pneumonia || Favourite Newcomer || 
|-
|  Most Promising New Act || 
|-
| Best Blues/Roots Act || 
|-
| Abbe May (Abbe May and The Rockin’ Pneumonia)|| Best Female Vocalist || 
|-
| rowspan=3 |2009 || Abbe May and The Rockin' Pneumonia - Howl and Moan || Most Popular Album || 
|-
| Abbe May || Best Female Vocalist || 
|-
| Abbe May and The Rockin’ Pneumonia || Best Blues / Roots Act || 
|-
| rowspan=2 | 2010 || rowspan=2 | Abbe May|| Best Female Vocalist || 
|-
| Best Female Vocalist || 
|-
| rowspan=3 | 2011 || rowspan=3 | Abbe May|| Most Popular Music Video || 
|-
| Best Female Vocalist || 
|-
| Best Blues & Roots Act || 
|-
| rowspan=8 | 2012 || rowspan=8 | Abbe May|| Most Popular Live Act || 
|-
| Most Popular Solo Artist || 
|-
| Most Popular Single / EP || 
|-
| Most Popular Album / EP || 
|-
| Rock Act of the Year || 
|-
| Blues Act of the Year || 
|-
| Guitarist of the Year || 
|-
| Female Vocalist of the Year || 
|-
| rowspan=3 | 2013 || rowspan=2 | Abbe May|| Female Vocalist of the Year || 
|-
| Solo Artist of the Year || 
|-
| Mathas – "Nourishment" (ft. Abbe May)|| Single of the Year || 
|-
| 2014 || Abbe May|| Female Vocalist of the Year || 
|-
| rowspan=2 | 2016 || Abbe May|| Female Vocalist of the Year || 
|-
| Abbe May - "Doomsday Clock" || Best Single || 
|-
| rowspan=2 | 2018 || Abbe May - "Fruit" || Best Album ||

References

External links

 
 Facebook
 Twitter
 Instagram

1983 births
Living people
Australian singer-songwriters
People from Bunbury, Western Australia
21st-century Australian singers
21st-century Australian women singers
Australian women singer-songwriters